RIN Grand Hotel is a four-star hotel located in the Vitan area in Bucharest, Romania. It is located in South – East Bucharest,  from one of the largest squares in Europe, Piaţa Unirii (Union Square), and close to the commercial and historical centers and the București Mall, one of the biggest and most-visited malls in the city.

As of 2022, the Rin Grand Hotel is the fifth-largest hotel in Europe and the largest hotel in the European Union in terms of room count, having a total of 1,459 rooms.

Construction
At first, the hotel was intended to have 1,000 rooms and the building, only 11 floors and the cost would have been around €30 million. But with the demolition of the Rossiya Hotel in 2006, which was the second-largest hotel in Europe at the time with 3,182 rooms, the developers saw an opportunity to construct an even larger hotel than initially envisioned and thus the hotel was upgraded to 1,459 rooms and the building heightened to 15 floors. The construction of the Rin Grand Hotel started in 2006 on a  plot of land located in Southern Bucharest in the Vitan area where no major hotel existed at the time. The first 630 rooms were finished in October 2007 and the rest of the 1,459 rooms were finished in March 2008 in time for the 20th NATO Summit held in Bucharest; its invitees occupied 900 rooms. The  hotel was built at a cost of €60 million and is owned by the RIN Group.

Facilities
The RIN Grand Hotel has 1,459 rooms spread over 12 floors. The hotel also has 25 conference rooms with capacities ranging from 18 to 1,000 seats, with the largest having . Its three restaurants include La Boema, which has a capacity of 210 people, and Stars, with a capacity of 650 people. The hotel also features a 1,000 places parking, a 

The hotel currently has only 489 room, after some of the rooms were closed and converted into residential apartments.

See also
List of tallest buildings in Romania

References

External links
Official website

Skyscraper hotels in Bucharest
Hotel buildings completed in 2008